Senešci is a settlement northwest of Velika Nedelja in the Municipality of Ormož in northeastern Slovenia. The area belongs to the traditional region of Styria. It is now included in the Drava Statistical Region.

There is a small roadside chapel with a belfry and an open porch in the settlement. It was built in 1904.

References

External links
Senešci on Geopedia

Populated places in the Municipality of Ormož